Acraea disjuncta is a butterfly in the family Nymphalidae. It is found in the Democratic Republic of the Congo, Kenya and Uganda.

Description
 
A. disjuncta Sm. (= nandensis E. Sharpe) (60 c) resembles a small male jodutta; both wings blackish above with light yellow markings; the hindmarginal spot of the forewing is broad, without, however, reaching the base of cellules 1 a and 1 b; the subapical band is about 4 mm. in breadth and has a small spot in 3, which 
touches the hindmarginal spot; the median band on the upperside of the hindwing is about 8 mm. in breadth and the dark, sharply defined marginal band consequently at most 3 mm. Nandi, Ruwenzori; Lake Kiwi.

Subspecies
Acraea disjuncta disjuncta (western Kenya, Uganda)
Acraea disjuncta kigeziensis Jackson, 1956 (Uganda: west to Toro and Kigezi, Democratic Republic of the Congo: Kivu and Ituri)

Biology
The larvae feed on Urera hypselodendron.

Taxonomy
It is a member of the Acraea jodutta species group -  but see also Pierre & Bernaud, 2014

References

External links

 Images representing Acraea disjuncta at Bold
Acraea disjuncta disjuncta at Pteron

Butterflies described in 1898
disjuncta
Butterflies of Africa
Taxa named by Henley Grose-Smith